"Yesterday" is a song by American R&B singer–songwriter Toni Braxton. The track is the lead single from her album, Pulse, released on May 4, 2010. Trey Songz appears on the American version released to radio, "Troy Taylor Radio Edit". Outside North America, the original version of the song was released, which features only Braxton's vocals.

The song was a moderate success on Billboard'''s Hot R&B/Hip-Hop Songs and peaked at number twelve. In the United Kingdom, the song debuted at number 50 on the Official UK Singles top 100 Chart and at number 17 on R&B Singles top 40.

Background and release
The song was released on Braxton's official website on September 29, 2009, after four years in hiatus. It is Braxton's first single released under Atlantic Records. In the United Kingdom, the song was supposed to be released on February 22, 2010, but ultimately the single release date was moved to May 3, 2010. "Yesterday" is Braxton's first single release in the UK since "Hit the Freeway" in 2003, as Libra was only available on import and no singles from the album were released there.

A Spanish version of the track, titled "Ayer", was recorded with Alexander Acha but remains unreleased to this day.

Critical reception
The song received positive reviews from music critics. Nick Levine from Digital Spy rated the song 3 out of 5 stars and favorably reviewed the solo version of the song, saying: "'Yesterday' shares a little too much of its DNA with Beyoncé's 'Halo' to satisfy fully, but [Braxton] sounds as seductive as ever crooning the surprisingly bitter lyrics - ("I don't love you, don't need you, can't stand you,") she insists on the middle 8. In fact, when she growls those last three words, it's almost like she never went away. Mark Edward Nero from About.com say, positively, "Arguably the best song on Pulse is the passionately bitter break-up song 'Yesterday', but interestingly, the better of two versions of the song isn't included on the album's standard version". Andy Kellman from Allmusic said: "'Yesterday' is a bitter breakup ballad in which the teeth-clenched 'I don’t love ya/Don’t need ya/Can’t stand ya no more' sounds very real". Mikael Wood from Los Angeles Times said: "Opener 'Yesterday' cribs its twinkly emo-soul texture (and some of its airy vocal melody) from Beyoncé's 'Broken-Hearted Girl'".

Music video

There are two versions of the music video for "Yesterday": one for the original solo version and one for the remix featuring Trey Songz.
Filming the video for the single started on October 8, 2009 in Los Angeles with director Bille Woodruff (known for such classic Braxton videos as "Un-Break My Heart" and "He Wasn't Man Enough"). Photos from the video were revealed on her official website on October 28 and show Braxton playing a piano, and Songz playing her boyfriend. The video premiered on The Wendy Williams Show on November 20, 2009. The video features singer Brooke Hogan as well as basketball players Shannon Brown and Ron Artest from the Los Angeles Lakers. The video tells the story about a woman (Braxton) who discovers that her boyfriend (Brown) is cheating on her with another woman (Hogan).

Promotion
Braxton's promotion of the track commenced at the Soul Train Music Awards of 2009, along with Songz. Braxton also promoted the single in the UK with performances on GMTV on 11 May 2010, Loose Women and The David Dickinson Show on 18 May 2010.

Chart performance
"Yesterday" debuted at number 96 on the U.S. Billboard'' Hot R&B/Hip-Hop Songs chart. On the issue dated January 2, 2010, the song made a massive 39-spot jump and has now peaked at number twelve, making it her highest chart performance since her 2000 single "Just Be a Man About It", which peaked at number six. In the UK, "Yesterday" became Braxton's first hit single since the release of "Hit the Freeway", peaking at number 50 on the UK Singles Chart and at number seventeen on the UK R&B Singles Chart.

Formats and track listings

U.S. iTunes digital EP
 "Yesterday" (Remix featuring Trey Songz) — 3:46
 "Yesterday" (Album Version) — 3:48
 "Yesterday" (Instrumental) — 3:48

U.S. Wal-Mart CD single
 "Yesterday" (Remix featuring Trey Songz) — 3:46
 "Rewind" — 3:30

German digital single
 "Yesterday" (Album Version) — 3:48
 "Yesterday" (Bimbo Jones Mix) — 7:05
 "Yesterday" (Fred Falke Mix) — 7:02
 "Yesterday" (Dave Audé Club Mix) - 8:41
 "Yesterday" (Remix featuring Trey Songz) — 3:46
 "Yesterday" (Video) — 3:47

German CD single
 "Yesterday" (Album Version) — 3:48
 "Yesterday" (Remix featuring Trey Songz) — 3:46

UK digital single
 "Yesterday" (Album Version) — 3:48

UK iTunes digital single
 "Yesterday" (Album Version) — 3:48
 "Rewind" — 3:30

UK iTunes digital remix single
 "Yesterday" (Bimbo Jones Mix) — 7:05
 "Yesterday" (Fred Falke Mix) — 7:02
 "Yesterday" (Nu Addiction Mix) — 6:04
 "Yesterday" (Sticky Lovers Remix) — 4:58
 "Yesterday" (Remix featuring Trey Songz) — 3:46

UK 7Digital digital single
 "Yesterday" (Album Version) — 3:48
 "Yesterday" (Cutmore Mix) — 6:18

UK 7" Vinyl
 "Yesterday" (Sticky Lovers Remix) — 4:58
 "Yesterday" (Sticky Lovers Dub Mix) — 4:58

Charts

Weekly charts

Year-end charts

Release history

References

2000s ballads
2009 singles
Music videos directed by Bille Woodruff
Pop ballads
Contemporary R&B ballads
Song recordings produced by DJ Frank E
Songs written by DJ Frank E
Toni Braxton songs
Trey Songz songs
2009 songs
Atlantic Records singles
Songs written by Toni Braxton